Matea is a feminine given name. It is the feminine form of the male name Mateo, Matej or Matija, which are Croatian forms of Matthew. Notable people with the name include:

 Matea Bošnjak, Croatian footballer
 Matea Čiča, Croatian badminton player
 Matea Ferk, Croatian alpine skier
 Matea Ikić, Croatian volleyball player
 Matea Jelić, Croatian taekwondo athlete, Olympic champion
 Matea Matošević, Croatian long-distance runner
 Matea Mezak, Croatian tennis player
 Matea Parlov Koštro, Croatian long-distance runner
 Matea Pletikosić, Croatian-Montenegrin handball player
 Matea Samardžić, Croatian swimmer
 Matea Sumajstorčić, Croatian swimmer

See also
 
 Mateja
Mateo (disambiguation)
Mateo (given name)
 Mateo (surname)

External links
 https://www.behindthename.com/name/matea

Croatian feminine given names